Belgium was represented by Jean Vallée, with the song "L'amour ça fait chanter la vie", at the 1978 Eurovision Song Contest, which took place on 22 April in Paris.

Before Eurovision

Eurosong 
French-language broadcaster RTBF was in charge of the selection of the Belgian entry for the 1978 Contest. Information on the venue of, and host for, the final is not currently available. Eight songs participated in the selection and the winner was chosen by an expert jury, although again it is not known whether full results were given or only the winner announced. Unusually, all but one of the participants were male.

Vallée was the winner of the national final for the contest. he had previously represented Belgium in the 1970 contest in Amsterdam, where he had finished fifth. Another previous Belgian entrant Jacques Hustin (1974) also took part.

At Eurovision 
On the night of the final Vallée performed 10th in the running order, following Switzerland and preceding the Netherlands. At the close of the voting "L'amour ça fait chanter la vie" had received 125 points with votes from all other participating countries apart from Denmark and Turkey, and including five first-place 12 points votes from France, Greece, Ireland, Monaco and the United Kingdom. This ranked Belgium second of the 20 competing countries, the highest position achieved by a Belgian entry in Eurovision to that date, which has since only been bettered by Sandra Kim's 1986 victory and matched by Urban Trad in 2003. The Belgian jury awarded its 12 points to contest winners Israel.

Voting

References 

1978
Countries in the Eurovision Song Contest 1978
Eurovision